Serena Autieri (born 4 April 1976) is an Italian actress and singer. She co-hosted the 53rd presentation of the annual Sanremo Music Festival in 2003, along with Pippo Baudo and Claudia Gerini.

Career 
Serena Autieri was born in Naples, Campania. As a child she studied ballet, singing, and acting.

On 14 April 2003, she released her album CD Anima Soul. Her television debut was in 1998 on the soap opera Un posto al sole broadcast by RAI Tre. Autieri made her first appearance on the stage in 2002 in the musical Bulli e pupe. The following year, in 2003, she was co-host for the 52nd presentation of the nationally televised Sanremo Music Festival alongside presenter Pippo Baudo and actress Claudia Gerini. In 2004, she had her first starring role in a major picture with Sara May, which was directed by Marianna Sciveres.

Autieri, who is blonde and blue-eyed, has had roles in several soap operas and television mini-series. These include  La maledizione dei templari ("The Curse of the Templars"), in which she portrayed Clemence of Hungary, and L'onore e il rispetto ("Honor and Respect"), where she played the part of Olga.

In 2013, Serena supplied the talking and singing parts for Elsa, the Snow Queen in the Italian dub of the Disney Animation, Frozen, (Italian: "Frozen - Il Regno di Ghiaccio", meaning "Frozen - The Kingdom of Ice").

Autieri occasionally appears in television commercials.

Discography
 Anima Soul (2003, album CD)

Theatre 
 Bulli e pupe (2002)
 Vacanze Romane (2003/2004-05)
 Shakespeare in Jazz (2006)
 Facce da teatro (2007)
 A Midsummer Night's Dream (2008)
 Shakespeare in Jazz (2009)

Filmography

Films

Television

References

External links

1976 births
Living people
Musicians from Naples
Italian women singers
Actresses from Naples
Italian film actresses
Italian television actresses
Italian stage actresses
21st-century Italian singers
21st-century Italian women singers